Urophora stigma is a species of tephritid or fruit flies in the genus Urophora of the family Tephritidae.

Distribution
Sweden & Northwest Russia France, Hungary, Turkmenistan & Kirghizia.

References

Urophora
Insects described in 1840
Diptera of Europe
Diptera of Asia